María Esther Jiménez Ramos (born 20 November 1963) is a Mexican politician affiliated with the National Action Party. As of 2014 she served as Deputy of the LX Legislature of the Mexican Congress representing Puebla.

References

1963 births
Living people
People from Puebla
Women members of the Chamber of Deputies (Mexico)
National Action Party (Mexico) politicians
21st-century Mexican politicians
21st-century Mexican women politicians
Deputies of the LX Legislature of Mexico
Members of the Chamber of Deputies (Mexico) for Puebla